Danthonidium is a genus of Indian plants in the grass family. The only known species is Danthonidium gammiei, native to the State of Maharashtra in India.

References

External links
 Jepson Manual Treatment
 USDA Plants Profile
 Grass Manual Treatment

Danthonioideae
Endemic flora of India (region)
Grasses of India
Flora of Maharashtra
Monotypic Poaceae genera
Taxa named by Charles Edward Hubbard